The Coleshill School is a school with academy status in Coleshill, Warwickshire, England, founded in 1520.

Admissions
It is a mixed secondary school of about 1,000 pupils.  In September 2004, The Coleshill School obtained its "Maths and Computing College" status, which has been incorporated in some variations of its name. This new status has enabled increased funding for the school in order to develop its mathematics and ICT facilities.

History 
The academy was formerly Coleshill Grammar School and has been located at its present site since 1966 when it 
relocated from Church Hill Coleshill, the school had been at the Church Hill site (current building 18th. century), since the 16th. century

Sixth Form 
The Coleshill School operates a sixth form centre, where it recruits mainly from its Year 11 school leavers; but also from other local schools in the area. Both A-level and BTEC qualifications are offered.

In a 2006 Ofsted report, it was noted that "The effectiveness and efficiency of the sixth form are good with some outstanding features, such as the contribution the students make to the life of the school".

The education league tables of UK colleges indicates that sixth formers from The Coleshill School achieve, on average, fewer academic points than other schools both locally and nationally. In the Warwickshire area, The Coleshill School ranks 18th out of 26 schools with regard to A-level performance.

Staffing and teaching 
The 2006 Ofsted report indicates both positive and negative results with regards to teaching. Teaching is described as "satisfactory", with elaboration given as "There is a significant amount of good teaching,but a few lessons are unsatisfactory''".

On 14 April 2009, it was announced that Headteacher Kate Kearney would step down from Headteacher position at the end of the 2009 spring term. This is reported to be so that she can seek a fresh career challenge, and it has been stated that Kate Kearney believes the decision to be "in the best interests of the school". The announcement came days after regulator Ofsted announced the decision to place the school in Special Measures.

In 2016 the Coleshill School was rated 'Good' by Ofsted and this rating was upheld in the most recent inspection on 3 & 4 March 2020. Strengths were listed as being high expectations of students, behaviour, management and extra-curricular opportunities.

Headteachers

2009 implementation of Special Measures  

After a recent Ofsted inspection in March 2009, its report indicated that it is the opinion of Her Majesty's Chief Inspector that this school requires Special Measures because it is failing to give its pupils an acceptable standard of education. There are four stated areas of improvement that Ofsted has noted; these are:

 Ensure all teachers maximise the achievement, learning and progress of all pupils in lessons and consistently provide high quality written feedback when assessing pupils' work.
 Ensure there is consistency and coherence in the way that assessment information is used throughout the school to set realistic but challenging targets.
 Monitor pupils' progress rigorously and systematically and make sure that individual pupils know exactly how well they are doing and what they need to do to improve their work in all subjects.
 Increase the rigour and accuracy of self-evaluation and improvement planning at all levels of leadership.

The full report will be available from the Ofsted  website from 21 April 2009 onwards.

On Friday 16 July 2010, it was announced through the school website that the school was out of special measures. The report is available from the school website.

In 2016, the school was rated 'good' by Ofsted. This rating was recently upheld in the most recent Ofsted inspection on the 3rd & 4 March 2020.

Extra-curricular activities 

Within the last two years, school visits have been made to France, Spain, Poland, Italy and Namibia.

As well as these visits abroad, the school also offers more numerous trips and activities within the country. These include sports, choir, drama, dance, skiing trips, and residential visits.

Academic performance
As of 2012, academic achievement at GCSE level was well above average.

Alumni

Coleshill Grammar School
 David Willey American Physicist
 Charles George Bonner VC
 Sally Jones (journalist), tennis player and TV presenter
 Alan Merrick, footballer

References

External links
 Warwickshire County Council profile of Coleshill School
 Official school website
 EduBase

Educational institutions established in the 1520s
Coleshill, Warwickshire
Academies in Warwickshire
1520 establishments in England
Secondary schools in Warwickshire